Hamburg steak is a patty of ground beef. Made popular worldwide by migrating Germans, it became a mainstream dish around the start of the 19th century. It is related to Salisbury steaks, which also use ground beef. It is considered the origin of the ubiquitous hamburger, when, in the early 20th century, vendors began selling the Hamburg steak as a sandwich between bread.

History

The German equivalent of the Hamburg steak is the Frikadelle, also known as a Frikadelle or Bulette, which is known to have existed in the 17th century.

In the late 19th century, the Hamburg steak became popular on the menus of many restaurants in the port of New York. This kind of fillet was beef ground by hand, lightly salted, often smoked, and usually served raw in a dish along with onions and bread crumbs. The oldest document that refers to the Hamburg steak in English is a Delmonico's Restaurant menu from 1873 that offered customers an 11-cent plate of Hamburg steak that had been developed by American chef Charles Ranhofer (1836–1899). This price was high for the time, twice the price of a simple fillet of beef steak. By the end of the century, the Hamburg steak was gaining popularity because of its ease of preparation and decreasing cost. This is evident from its detailed description in some of the most popular cookbooks of the day. Documents show that this preparation style was used by 1887 in some US restaurants and was also used for feeding patients in hospitals; the Hamburg steak was served raw or lightly cooked and was accompanied by a raw egg.

The menus of many American restaurants during the 19th century included a Hamburg beefsteak that was often sold for breakfast. A variant of Hamburg steak is Salisbury steak, which is usually served with a gravy similar in texture to brown sauce. Invented by Dr. James Salisbury (1823–1905), the term Salisbury steak has been used in the United States since 1897.

By 1930, Hamburg steaks were usually served as part of a sandwich known as a hamburger; the meat part of the sandwich became known as a patty. The term "hamburger" has in turn often been shortened to simply "burger". "Burger" is now commonly used as a suffix to create new words for different variants of the hamburger, including cheeseburger, porkburger, baconburger, and mooseburger.

Preparation
Hamburg steak is made from finely ground beef. Seasoning, egg, breadcrumb, onion and milk may be combined with the meat, which is then formed into patties and cooked, by frying, roasting, or smoking.

Around the world 
Hamburg steak is listed by Escoffier as a classic dish in haute cuisine.

 is a popular dish in Japan.  It is made from ground meat with finely chopped onion, egg, and breadcrumbs flavored with various spices, and made into a flat, circular shape about 4 cm thick and 10 to 15 cm in diameter.  Many restaurants specialize in various styles of hamburg steak.<ref>Murakami, Haruki. The Elephant Vanishes, p. 188-194.</ref>  Some variations include hanbāgu topped with cheese (チーズハンバーグ, or chīzuhanbāgu), hanbāgu with Japanese curry, and Italian hanbāgu (with tomato sauce rather than demi-glace).

Hamburg steak became popular during the 1960s as a more affordable way to serve otherwise costly meat. Magazines regularly printed the recipe during that decade, elevating it to a staple dish in Japanese culture. In Japan, the dish dates back to the Meiji period and is believed to have been first served in Yokohama, which was one of the first ports opened to foreigners. Since the 1980s, vacuum-packed hamburgers are sold with sauce already added, and these are widely used in box lunches (bento). Frozen hamburgers are popular, as well, and are often served in fast-food style restaurants.

In Hawaii, hamburger steak is very similar to the Japanese hanbāgu. It consists of burger patty with brown gravy. It is usually served with macaroni salad and rice in a plate lunch. Also, another variety includes an egg, which is called loco moco.

In the Philippines, hamburger steaks are a popular menu item from the fast food chain Jollibee, and are served with gravy, mushrooms, and a side of steamed or adobo fried rice.

In Finland, the dish is called jauhelihapihvi'' ("ground meat steak") and is prepared and served like the meatball: pan-fried, and served with potatoes and brown sauce.

See also

 Cutlet

References

Bibliography
 

German beef dishes
Ground meat